Buhingu is an administrative ward in Uvinza District of Kigoma Region in Tanzania. 
In 2016 the Tanzania National Bureau of Statistics report there were 18,682 people in the ward, from 16,973 in 2012.

Villages / neighborhoods 
The ward has 4 villages and 15 hamlets.

 Kalilani
 Kabukuyungu
 Kalolwa
 Katumba
 Mahasa
 Nkonkwa
 Kashela
 Katembwe
 Katumbi
 Kariakoo
 Minago
 Mteme
 Tunde
 Buhingu
 Buhingu A
 Buhingu B
 Madukani
 Rubundui
 Vilongwa

References

Wards of Kigoma Region